Portrait of the Artist is an album by American jazz trombonist Bob Brookmeyer recorded in 1959 for the Atlantic label.

Reception

Allmusic awarded the album 3 stars.

Track listing
All compositions by Bob Brookmeyer except as indicated
 "Blues Suite: Introduction & First Movement" - 7:18
 "Blues Suite: Second Movement" - 3:53
 "Blues Suite: Third Movement" - 4:58
 "Blues Suite: Fourth Movement" - 5:18
 "It Don't Mean a Thing (If It Ain't Got That Swing)" (Duke Ellington, Irving Mills) - 6:15
 "Mellowdrama" - 5:50
 "Out of Nowhere" (Johnny Green, Edward Heyman) - 4:55
 "Darn That Dream" (Jimmy Van Heusen, Eddie DeLange) - 4:26 
Recorded in NYC on March 9 (tracks 7 & 8), April 6 (tracks 1, 3 & 4) and April 9 (tracks 2, 5 & 6), 1959

Personnel 
Bob Brookmeyer - valve trombone, piano, arranger
Ray Copeland (tracks 7 & 8), Bernie Glow (tracks 1, 3 & 4), Marky Markowitz (tracks 7 & 8) Ernie Royal (tracks 1 & 3-6), Nick Travis (tracks 2, 5 & 6) - trumpet
Frank Rehak - trombone 
John Barrows (tracks 2 & 5-8), Earl Chapin (tracks 1, 3 & 4) - French horn
Bill Barber (tracks 2 & 5-8), Don Butterfield (tracks 1, 3 & 4) - tuba
Danny Bank - flute, clarinet, baritone saxophone (tracks 2, 5 & 6)
Gene Quill - alto saxophone, clarinet 
Al Cohn - tenor saxophone (tracks 1, 3 & 4) 
Gene Allen - baritone saxophone, tenor saxophone (tracks 7 & 8)
George Duvivier  - bass
Charlie Persip - drums

References 

1960 albums
Atlantic Records albums
Bob Brookmeyer albums
Albums produced by Nesuhi Ertegun